Heeralaal Pannalaal is a 1978 Indian Hindi-language action comedy film directed and produced by Ashok Roy. The film stars Shashi Kapoor, Randhir Kapoor, Zeenat Aman and Neetu Singh, while Premnath, Ranjeet, Madan Puri, Ajit, Amjad Khan, Kamini Kaushal play supporting roles.

Plot
The movie starts with two innocent and kind hearted guys named Heeralal (Shashi Kapoor) and Pannalal (Randhir Kapoor). They are famous among criminals as they have helped police in capturing them several times. Heeralal is in search of his parents' killer but has no idea of him at all. Pannalal is in search of his father. Heeralal meets with a girl named Ruby (Zeenat Aman) and falls in love with her. Pannalal falls in love with Ruby's friend, Neelam (Neetu Singh).

Kalicharan (Ajit), who is a renowned criminal has decided to teach a lesson to Heeralal and Pannalal for interfering in their business. But instead Kalicharan is forced to run from the police. Police Commissioner, Premlal (Premnath) is very happy with the guys and wants to protect them from Kalicharan and his friend, Panther (Amjad Khan). They find that Kalicharan was the one who killed Heeralal's parents, but surprisingly, Kalicharan is none other than Pannalal's father. 

Heeralal and Pannalal rescue the people who were caught in a fire. In the end, Heeralal-Ruby and Pannalal-Neelam unite.

Cast

Soundtrack

References

External links
 

1978 films
1970s Hindi-language films
Films scored by R. D. Burman
1970s action comedy films
Indian action comedy films